Sofía Reinoso (born 23 October 1996) is a Mexican slalom canoeist who has competed at the international level since 2013. She lives in Tlapacoyan, Mexico and is coached by Silvan Poberaj.

Career 

In 2019, she won bronze medals in the K1 and Extreme K1 events at the 2019 Pan American Games held in Lima, Peru. By doing this she became the first slalom paddler representing Mexico to win a medal at the Pan American Games. In 2015, she competed in the K1 event at the 2015 Pan American Games without winning a medal.

In 2020, Sofía won a bronze medal in the Extreme K1 event at the 2020 Canoe Slalom World Cup in Pau, the first canoe slalom medal for Mexico at an ICF event. She earned her best senior world championship result, of 51st, at the 2014 event at Deep Creek.

Mexico was allocated the Pan American Olympic quota for women's K1 following the cancellation of the continental championships, with it allocated to the NOC with the highest-ranked eligible athlete. Reinoso represented Mexico in the K1 event at the delayed 2020 Summer Olympics in Tokyo, where she finished 21st after being eliminated in the semifinal.

World Cup individual podiums

References

External links 

 

Living people
1996 births
Mexican female canoeists
Pan American Games medalists in canoeing
Pan American Games bronze medalists for Mexico
Canoeists at the 2015 Pan American Games
Canoeists at the 2019 Pan American Games
Medalists at the 2019 Pan American Games
Canoeists at the 2020 Summer Olympics
Olympic canoeists of Mexico
People from Puebla (city)
21st-century Mexican women